Joseph Saville Cony (1834 – February 10, 1867) was an officer in the United States Navy who served during the American Civil War. The   was named in his honor.

Biography
Cony was born in 1834 in Eastport, Maine. He was appointed acting ensign November 3, 1862.

This small force captured ten men, one 12-pounder howitzer, eighteen horses, and destroyed the blockade running schooner Alexander Cooper and extensive salt works. For this accomplishment Joseph S. Cony was promoted to Acting Master on September 7, 1863.

During his cruise in this vessel he participated in the first attack on Fort Fisher.

Cony was honorably discharged November 7, 1865. In 1866, Mr. Cony was appointed Lieutenant in the regular navy. By that time he was master of the merchant vessel, City of Bath, at sea. Before he could accept this appointment, he went down with his ship off Cape Hatteras on February 10, 1867.

References

External links
 DANFS biography of Joseph Cony

1834 births
1867 deaths
Union Navy officers
People from Eastport, Maine
United States Navy officers
People of Maine in the American Civil War